Misaele Draunibaka (born April 6, 1992)  is a Fijian footballer who plays as a midfielder.

References

External links
 

Living people
1992 births
Fijian footballers
Fiji international footballers
I-Taukei Fijian people
Labasa F.C. players
Rewa F.C. players
2012 OFC Nations Cup players
Association football forwards